Matthew Kent (born 2 July 1980 in Melbourne, Australia) is a baseball player.

Kent signed with the Seattle Mariners in 1997 at the age of 16 as a catcher and from 1998–1999 he played for the AZL Mariners in the Arizona League. In 2000, Kent was promoted to A- with the Everett AquaSox. After only producing a poor season with the bat, Kent was released from the Seattle organisation for the 2001 season.

In 2006, the Boston Red Sox picked up Kent after a six-year absence in the States and played A+ ball for the Wilmington Blue Rocks as well as playing a few games for the Pawtucket Red Sox. However, Kent failed to product with the bat, batting a dismal .133 for the season and was released by Boston at the end of the season.

Kent made his Claxton Shield debut with the Victoria Aces in the 2005 Claxton Shield. He also played for the Australian national baseball team in the 2006 World Baseball Classic as well as the 2007 Baseball World Cup where he was instrumental in Australia's 30–4 demolition of Thailand, hitting 5 from 6 with two doubles. He also provided a game changing RBI in the 2008 Olympic Qualification win against Canada.

After being released from Boston, he went to play in the independent American Association League with the El Paso Diablos.

External links

1980 births
Living people
Arizona League Mariners players
Australian expatriate baseball players in the United States
El Paso Diablos players
Everett AquaSox players
Kalamazoo Kings players
Pawtucket Red Sox players
Sportspeople from Melbourne
Wilmington Blue Rocks players
2006 World Baseball Classic players